Eye for an Eye is a 1996 American psychological thriller film, directed by John Schlesinger and written by Rick Jaffa and Amanda Silver. It stars Sally Field, Kiefer Sutherland, Ed Harris, Beverly D'Angelo, Joe Mantegna and Cynthia Rothrock. The story was adapted from Erika Holzer's novel of the same name. The film opened on January 12, 1996.

Plot
Karen (Sally Field) and Mack McCann (Ed Harris) are happily married with two daughters, seventeen-year-old Julie (from Karen's previous marriage) and six-year-old Megan. One afternoon while Karen is out shopping, Julie is violently raped and murdered, which Karen overhears on the phone. Detective Joe Denillo assures the McCanns there is enough DNA evidence to find and convict the killer, and encourages Karen to seek counselling.

At a support group, Karen meets people in similar circumstances, including Albert and Regina Gratz, and Sidney Hughes.  During the meeting, Karen overhears Albert talking to Sidney about something which alarms Regina. Meanwhile, the DNA tests reveal Julie's killer to be Robert Doob (Kiefer Sutherland), a delivery driver with a criminal record. However at the trial, Doob is released as the defense did not receive a sample of the evidence, and the judge dismisses the case. Karen and Mack are horrified as Doob walks free.

Mack is desperate to return to a normal life, but Karen cannot stop thinking about Doob. She finds out where he lives and keeps detailed records of his movements. Karen follows Doob while he goes out on deliveries and attempts to warn a female customer, but the woman only speaks Spanish and does not understand her. Karen later learns that the murderer of the Gratzs' son has been killed in a drive-by shooting, just days after being released from prison. Angel, also in the self-help group, tells Karen the best way to get over her grief is to focus on having good experiences with her living daughter, making Karen realize she has been so fixated on Doob that Megan has been deprived of her attention.

Doob discovers Karen is stalking him and goes to Megan's school. When Karen comes to pick Megan up, Doob deliberately intimidates her and threatens to harm Megan if she continues following him. Worried for Megan's safety and with her sanity declining, Karen approaches Sidney, who admits he and Martin set up the drive-by shooting. Karen demands their help and they agree to find a weapon, train her, and plan the murder, but tell her she has to carry it out. Karen agrees and they begin plotting. She also joins a self-defense class, which helps her gain more confidence, helps rekindle her sex life with Mack, and improves her relationship with Megan. Sidney gives Karen a gun.

Angel reveals that she is really an undercover FBI Agent investigating vigilante activity within the support group, and warns Karen not to kill Doob. Karen then calls Sidney to tell him she cannot go through with it, but later changes her mind when she learns the Spanish customer she tried to warn about Doob has been raped and murdered. Karen is furious when Doob once again walks free because, as the grocery delivery man, his prints and hair/carpet fibers belong in the house. He even wore a condom to prevent leaving DNA, something he didn’t do with Julie.

Karen sets a trap to lure Doob into her home while Mack and Megan are out of town so that she can say killing him was self-defense, and it works. Despite Doob's attempts to fight back, Karen ultimately shoots Doob dead after a struggle. Denillo arrives on the scene and tells Karen that he knows the truth and that she has not fooled him, to which she replies, "Prove it."  He decides to tell his colleague that it was a "clear case of self-defense". When Mack arrives, he sits beside her, holding her hand, also knowing what she has done.

Cast

 Sally Field as Karen McCann  
 Kiefer Sutherland as Robert Doob
 Ed Harris  as Mack McCann
 Joe Mantegna as Det. Joe Denillo
 Beverly D'Angelo as Dolly Green
 Olivia Burnette as Julie McCann
 Alexandra Kyle as Megan McCann
 Darrell Larson as Peter Green
 Charlayne Woodard as Angel Kosinsky
 Philip Baker Hall as Sidney Hughes
 William Mesnik as Albert Gratz
 Rondi Reed as Regina Gratz
 Keith David as Martin
 Donal Logue as Tony
 Grand L. Bush as Tyrone
 Armin Shimerman as Judge Arthur Younger
 Nicholas Cascone as District Attorney Howard Bolinger
 Ross Bagley as Sean Kosinsky
 Cynthia Rothrock as Tina
 Stella Garcia as Maria

Critical reception
On Rotten Tomatoes, the film holds a score of 8% with an average rating of 3.6/10, based on 40 reviews. The site's consensus states: "Overwrought, thinly written, and all-around unpleasant, Eye for an Eye crudely exploits every parent's nightmare with deeply offensive results." On Metacritic, the film holds a rating of 25/100 based on reviews from 23 critics, indicating "generally unfavorable reviews." Audiences polled by CinemaScore gave the film an average grade of "A−" on an A+ to F scale.
 
Roger Ebert gave the film one star (out of four), calling it "a particularly nasty little example of audience manipulation" and writing that it "is intellectually corrupt because it deliberately avoids dealing with the issues it raises." Ebert also compared the film to Dead Man Walking, saying "Dead Man Walking challenges us to deal with a wide range of ethical and moral issues. Eye for an Eye cynically blinkers us, excluding morality as much as it can, to service an exploitation plot." Janet Maslin of The New York Times wrote "Never in his varied career has Mr. Schlesinger made a film as mean-spirited and empty as this." She also felt "The sole purpose of "Eye for an Eye" is to excite blood lust from the audience".

See also
List of films featuring home invasions
Vigilante film

References

External links
 
 
 
 

1996 films
1990s crime drama films
1996 crime thriller films
1990s psychological thriller films
American crime drama films
American crime thriller films
American psychological thriller films
Films about miscarriage of justice
American films about revenge
Films based on American novels
Films based on crime novels
Films directed by John Schlesinger
Films scored by James Newton Howard
Films set in Santa Monica, California
Paramount Pictures films
American rape and revenge films
Films with screenplays by Rick Jaffa and Amanda Silver
American vigilante films
1990s vigilante films
1996 drama films
1990s English-language films
1990s American films